Enteromius guildi is a species of ray-finned fish in the genus Enteromius which is found only in the upper reached of the River Hedjo on the border between Togo and Ghana.

The fish is named in honor of Paul D. Guild (b. 1943), a Peace Corps colleague of the describer for three years in the Republic of Togo.

Footnotes 

 

Enteromius
Fish described in 1973
Taxa named by Paul V. Loiselle